Deba, sometimes known as Deba Habe, is a town in Gombe State in northern Nigeria. It is headquarter of the Yamaltu/Deba local government area, Gombe State. As of 1995, it had an estimated population of 135,400.

References

Populated places in Gombe State